Teeland's Country Store, also known as Herning's Place and Knik Trading Company, is a historic retail establishment located at the corner of East Herning Avenue and North Boundary Street in Wasilla, Alaska.  The oldest portion of this wood-frame building is a log structure at the back whose construction dates to 1905.  Originally located at Knik, this log structure, then also used as a store, was moved to the newly established town of Wasilla in 1917 by its builder, O. G. Herning.  Herning also built the present utilitarian wood-frame structure, which still operates today.  The business was purchased by Walter Teeland in 1947, giving it its present name. In 1972 the store was purchased by Jules and Leslie Mead and Neil Gail Bridgewater.

The building was listed on the National Register of Historic Places in 1978.

In 1986 the Meads donated the building to the Wasilla-Knik-Willow Creek Historical Society. The building was moved and over the next ten years it was restored to the original look of the Herning's Place.

1998 Jules and Leslie's son Brian Mead and his wife Colene opened Mead's Coffee House in the building which had become known as the Herning-Teeland-Mead Building.

See also
National Register of Historic Places listings in Matanuska-Susitna Borough, Alaska

References

Buildings and structures completed in 1917
Commercial buildings on the National Register of Historic Places in Alaska
Buildings and structures on the National Register of Historic Places in Matanuska-Susitna Borough, Alaska
Relocated buildings and structures in Alaska
Retail buildings in Alaska
Wasilla, Alaska